Bhargavaea is a bacteria genus from the family of Planococcaceae.

References

Further reading 
 
 
 

Bacillales
Bacteria genera